The Delaware Association of Independent Schools (DAIS) is a non-profit consortium of schools that work together to promote independent education and to support and strengthen the administrative activities of independent member schools by providing professional development, cooperative efforts, and inter-school collaboration. Members include:
 Albert EInstein Academy
 Archmere Academy
 Centreville Layton School
 The College School
 Hockessin Montessori
 The Independence School
 Padua Academy
 The Pilot School
 Salesianum School
 Sanford School
 St. Andrew's School
 St. Anne's Episcopal School
 St. Edmond's Academy
 St. Elizabeth's High School
 St. Mark's High School
 The Tatnall School
 Tower Hill School
 Ursuline Academy
 Westtown School
 Wilmington Christian School
 Wilmington Friends School
 Wilmington Montessori School

References

External links
 Official Website

Education in Delaware